Róbert Bérczesi (born in 1976) is a Hungarian musician, best known as the lead singer and songwriter of the Hungarian cult band hiperkarma. Before hiperkarma, he won a Hungarian talent spotter (the Pepsi Generation Next at 1997) with his band called BlaBla, then as the winner of the talent spotter they could make their own studio album Kétségbeejtően átlagos with the Sony Music Entertainment label. With hiperkarma, they only made two albums, hiperkarma (2000) and amondo (2003). 
After hiperkarma he had two notable projects, Biorobot with the Hungarian songwriter András Nemes, and his solo project, Én meg az ének.

Discography 

BlaBla
 Izék (demo) (1996)
 Kétségbeejtően átlagos (1998)

Hiperkarma
 hiperkarma (2000)
 amondó (2003)
 konyharegény (2014)
 délibáb (2017)
 a napsütötte rész (2019)

Én meg az ének (solo project)
 Én meg az ének: Emléxel? (2011)

Biorobot
 BioRoBoT (2013)

References

1976 births
Living people
Hungarian musicians